Akbari is an Iranian/Persian surname. Notable people with the surname include:

 Alireza Akbari (1961–2023), Iranian politician and dual Iranian-British citizen
 Fatema Akbari (born 1974), Afghan political figure
 Hashem Akbari (born 1949), Iranian-American professor at Concordia University
 Jalal Akbari (born 1983), Iranian footballer
 Mania Akbari (born 1974), Iranian film director
 Mohammad Hossein Akbari (born 1950), Iranian tennis player 
 Mohammad Reza Akbari (born 1986), Iranian basketball player
 Rahmat Akbari (born 2000), Australian association football player
 Raumesh Akbari (born 1984), Tennessee House of Representatives District 91
 Suzanne Conklin Akbari, Historian at the Institute for Advanced Study 
 Taghi Akbari (born 1945), Iranian tennis player
 Yadollah Akbari (born 1974), Iranian footballer

Iranian-language surnames